Anot Naga "Arnold" Setiadi (born  February 11, 1988 in Jakarta, Indonesia) is an American badminton player.

Arnold is currently ranked nationally in three events. His highest ranking is at number three in Men's Doubles with partner Andrew Todt. His accomplishments, especially with regard to the 2006 IBF World Junior Championships, rank him among the best junior players in recent American history. He is currently training in a badminton facility in Milpitas, California with coach and spiritual mentors Gumaro Diaz and Twee Phan.

2006, 2007, 2009, 2010 and 2011 he participated at the US Open Badminton Championships. 2009 he was part of the US team at the Pan Am Championships. His best international results were rank 3 at the 2010 Guatemala International, rank 3 at the 2010 Puerto Rico International and rank 5 at the 2011 Peru International. His highest world ranking positions were rank 80 in the doubles and rank 145 in the singles.

References 

 http://bwfcontent.tournamentsoftware.com/profile/default.aspx?id=B9767038-61C7-4A36-BCF4-DD4B4C201FEA

American male badminton players
Indonesian emigrants to the United States
Sportspeople from Jakarta
1988 births
Living people